Proischnura rotundipennis, the round-winged bluet is a species of damselfly in the family Coenagrionidae. It is endemic to South Africa, where it is scarce and localised.

This species is found in the grassland biome, where its natural habitat is grassy verges of ponds and slow-flowing streams.

This bluet is 22–27 mm long, with a wingspan of 30–32 mm. The thorax is greenish blue with black dorsal and antehumeral stripes. The upper abdomen is mainly black; segments eight and nine are bright blue and segment ten is black.  Key features for identification in the field are rounded wing-tips and the short, broad pterostigmata which are dark with pale edges.

References

Coenagrionidae
Insects of South Africa
Insects described in 1921